Acacia tingoorensis, also known as Tingoora wattle, is a tree belonging to the genus Acacia and the subgenus Juliflorae that is native to eastern Australia.

Description
It usually has dense angular branchlets that are velvety with dense fine hairs. Like most species of Acacia it has phyllodes rather than true leaves. It blooms between August and September producing golden flowers.

Distribution
It is endemic  to a small area in the South Burnett Region around Kingaroy in South East Queensland where it is found along road sides often is dense stands and growing in deep red loam or sandy soils as a part of Eucalyptus woodland communities. It is found to the east of the natural range of Acacia longispicata.

See also
List of Acacia species

References

tingoorensis
Flora of Queensland
Taxa named by Leslie Pedley
Plants described in 1999